Russia participated in the Eurovision Song Contest 2018 with the song "I Won't Break" written by Netta Nimrodi, Leonid Gutkin and Arie Burshtein. The song was performed by Julia Samoylova, who was internally selected by the Russian broadcaster Channel One Russia to represent the nation at the 2018 contest in Lisbon, Portugal.

Background

Prior to the 2018 contest, Russia had participated in the Eurovision Song Contest twenty times since its first entry in 1994. Russia had won the contest on one occasion in 2008 with the song "Believe" performed by Dima Bilan. In , Russia finished third with the song "You Are the Only One" performed by Sergey Lazarev.

On 12 March 2017, Channel One announced that they had internally selected Julia Samoylova, with her song "Flame is Burning" for the Eurovision Song Contest 2017 which was held in Kyiv, Ukraine. However, on 22 March 2017, the Security Service of Ukraine (SBU) confirmed that Samoylova had been banned from entering Ukraine for three years for illegally travelling to Crimea. 
On 13 April 2017, the European Broadcasting Union (EBU) said Russia was no longer able to take part in 2017's competition. The Russian state broadcaster Channel One responded by stating that they will not broadcast the contest.

Before Eurovision

Internal selection 
On 29 January 2018, Channel One Russia officially confirmed that Julia Samoylova would represent Russia in the Eurovision Song Contest 2018. Her song for the contest, "I Won't Break" was revealed on the 11 March 2018.

At Eurovision 
According to Eurovision rules, all nations with the exceptions of the host country and the "Big Five" (France, Germany, Italy, Spain and the United Kingdom) are required to qualify from one of two semi-finals in order to compete for the final; the top ten countries from each semi-final progress to the final. The European Broadcasting Union (EBU) split up the competing countries into six different pots based on voting patterns from previous contests, with countries with favourable voting histories put into the same pot. On 29 January 2018, a special allocation draw was held which placed each country into one of the two semi-finals, as well as which half of the show they would perform in. Russia was placed into the second semi-final, to be held on 10 May 2018, and was scheduled to perform in the first half of the show.

Once all the competing songs for the 2018 contest had been released, the running order for the semi-finals was decided by the shows' producers rather than through another draw, so that similar songs were not placed next to each other. Russia was set to perform in position 6, following the entry from Denmark and preceding the entry from Moldova.

After the end of the show, Russia was not announced among the top 10 entries of the second semi-final and therefore did not qualify to compete in the final. It was later revealed that Russia placed 15th out of the 18 participating countries in the semi-final, receiving 65 points: 51 points from televoting and 14 points from juries.

Voting
Voting during the three shows involved each country awarding two sets of points from 1–8, 10 and 12: one from their professional jury and the other from televoting. Each nation's jury consisted of five music industry professionals who are citizens of the country they represent, with their names published before the contest to ensure transparency. This jury judged each entry based on: vocal capacity; the stage performance; the song's composition and originality; and the overall impression by the act. In addition, no member of a national jury was permitted to be related in any way to any of the competing acts in such a way that they cannot vote impartially and independently. The individual rankings of each jury member as well as the nation's televoting results were released shortly after the grand final.

Points awarded to Russia

Points awarded by Russia

Detailed voting results
The following members comprised the Russian jury:
 Vladimir Matetsky (jury chairperson)singer, songwriter, musician, record producer, author
 producer, manager
 Aleksandra Vorobyovasinger
 Sergey Mandrikchoreographer
 Alexey Manuylovradio host

References

External links 

Official Channel One Eurovision site

2018
Countries in the Eurovision Song Contest 2018
Eurovision